A diamine is an amine with exactly two amino groups. Diamines are used as monomers to prepare polyamides, polyimides, and polyureas. The term diamine refers mostly to primary diamines, as those are the most reactive.

In terms of quantities produced, 1,6-diaminohexane (a precursor to Nylon 6-6) is most important, followed by ethylenediamine. Vicinal diamines (1,2-diamines) are a structural motif in many biological compounds and are used as ligands in coordination chemistry.

Aliphatic diamines

Linear
 1 carbon: methylenediamine (diaminomethane) of theoretical interest only
 2 carbons: ethylenediamine (1,2-diaminoethane). Related derivatives include the N-alkylated compounds,  1,1-dimethylethylenediamine, 1,2-dimethylethylenediamine, ethambutol, tetrakis(dimethylamino)ethylene, TMEDA.

 3 carbons: 1,3-diaminopropane (propane-1,3-diamine) 
 4 carbons: putrescine (butane-1,4-diamine)
 5 carbons: cadaverine (pentane-1,5-diamine)

 6 carbons: hexamethylenediamine (hexane-1,6-diamine), trimethylhexamethylenediamine

Branched
Derivatives of ethylenediamine are prominent:
 1,2-diaminopropane, which is chiral.
 diphenylethylenediamine, two diastereomers, one of which is C2-symmetric.
 1,2-diaminocyclohexane, two diastereomers, one of which is C2-symmetric.

Cyclic
 1,4-Diazacycloheptane

Xylylenediamines
Xylylenediamines are classified as alkylamines since the amine is not directly attached to an aromatic ring.
o-xylylenediamine or OXD
 m-xylylenediamine or MXD
p-xylylenediamine or PXD

Aromatic diamines
Three phenylenediamines are known:
 o-phenylenediamine or OPD
 m-phenylenediamine or MPD
 p-phenylenediamine or PPD. 2,5-diaminotoluene is related to PPD but contains a methyl group on the ring.

Various N-methylated derivatives of the phenylenediamines are known:
 dimethyl-4-phenylenediamine, a reagent.
 N,N'-di-2-butyl-1,4-phenylenediamine, an antioxidant.
Examples with two aromatic rings include derivatives of biphenyl and naphthalene:
 4,4'-diaminobiphenyl
 1,8-diaminonaphthalene

References

External links
 
 Synthesis of diamines

 
Monomers